Mike Sertich (born 1947) is an American ice hockey coach. He was the head coach of Minnesota-Duluth from 1983 through to 2000. He continued coaching for several years after resigning before retiring.

Career
Mike Sertich began his career at Minnesota-Duluth in the mid-1960s, playing three years as a defenseman for the Bulldogs. After his playing days were over he got behind the bench at Grand Rapids High School with Gus Hendrickson, a man he would eventually replace as head coach. In 1975 both Sertich and Hendrickson would join the staff at his alma mater though Hendrickson, as head coach, saw very little success, having only one winning season in seven years. Sertich was chosen to replace Hendrickson for the 1982-83 season and brought about an immediate change.

In Sertich's first season at the helm, Minnesota-Duluth posted a 28-win season, the most victories the team had accumulated in one year to that point, and amassed the best record since it had joined the WCHA in 1965. Additionally they made their first NCAA Tournament appearance. The next season saw a slight improvement when the Bulldogs won the 1984 WCHA men's ice hockey tournament before marching all the way to the 1984 National Championship game but ended up losing to Bowling Green in quadruple overtime. Sertich saw more gains the following year with a second consecutive conference title and an outstanding 36-win season (UMD's only 30-win season to date) (as of 2014). Duluth finished the 1985 NCAA Tournament in third place, losing in the semifinal to eventual champion Rensselaer though this time only in triple overtime. For his exemplary record in his first three years as head coach Sertich was named WCHA coach of the Year each season (no other coach has ever won in consecutive years) and the national coach of the year in 1984.

After those early years, however, the Bulldogs fell back to the rest of the pack. After another successful season in 1985-86, Minnesota-Duluth would only have two winning seasons over the next nine years, one of which coming in 1992-93 when Sertich won both his last regular season title and coach of the year award (both from the WCHA). After a brief renaissance in the mid-1990s with three consecutive winning seasons the Bulldogs won only 7 games in 1998-99, their lowest total in 30 years, and while they improved the following season, it wasn't enough to keep Sertich around as he announced, mid-season, that the 2000 campaign would be his last.

Less than a year later Sertich was suddenly back in the college ranks after taking over at Michigan Tech in the middle of the season. Sertich replaced an ineffective Tim Watters after the latter began the year 1-7-1 and sought to fix the fortunes of the once-great Huskies, salvaging the season by going 7-17-3 the rest of the way. Sertich spent two more years in Houghton calling it quits a second time and while the results weren't shown in the standings, there was a definite improvement with the character of the team. Several years later Sertich signed on as an assistant at St. Scholastica College in Minnesota, but left after only two seasons, presumably (though not definitively) for good this time.

Head coaching record

Mid-Season replacement†

References

External links
Mike Sertich Career Record at College Hockey News

American ice hockey coaches
Minnesota Duluth Bulldogs men's ice hockey coaches
Michigan Tech Huskies men's ice hockey coaches
1947 births
Living people
People from Virginia, Minnesota
Ice hockey coaches from Minnesota
Ice hockey players from Minnesota